Huanren is a town in and the seat of Huanren Manchu Autonomous County, in the eastern Liaoning province, China, It is located  about  to the southwest of Tonghua.

References

External links
Official website of Huanren Town Government

Towns in Liaoning